The 1999 All-Ireland Senior Club Camogie Championship for the leading clubs in the women's team field sport of camogie was won by Granagh-Ballingarry (Limerick), who defeated Davitts (Gal) in the final, played at Tynagh. It was the first club championship to be played with 15 a side.

Arrangements
The championship was organised on the traditional provincial system used in Gaelic Games since the 1880s, with St Lachtain’s, Freshford (Kilkenny) and Leitrim Fontenoys winning the championships of the other two provinces. Jean Cullinane scored Granagh’s goal in the semi-final as they came from 1-4 to 0-2 behind at half time to beat St Lachtain’s. Davitt’s qualified for the final with two goals either side of half time from Mary Treacy and further goals from Doreen Kelly and Mary Treacy. Maureen McAleenan, who scored four points, was the best of the Leitrim Fontenoys team.

The Final
Eileen O'Brien was the Granagh star in the final, scoring 1–3 while Caitríona Finnegan scored a long-range goal for Davitt’s.

Final stages

References

External links
 Camogie Association

1999 in camogie
1999